Gwangyang is a city in South Jeolla Province, South Korea. Gwangyang city is the home of POSCO's Gwangyang Steel Works, the largest facility of its kind in the world. 
The city is also home to K League Classic football side Jeonnam Dragons.

Gwangyang is at the centre of development for the Gwangyang Bay Area Free Economic Zone (GFEZ), the third-largest among the six free economic zones of South Korea, covering 92.7 square kilometers. The Free Economic Zone focus on port container handling, steel production, shipbuilding as well as leisure facilities. The area has become a mega business hub, exploiting its accessibility to China.

Famous people from Gwangyang include National Intelligence Service head Kim Seung-kew.

To the north of the city is the county of Gurye, to the east along the Seomjin River is the county of Hadong in Gyeongsangnam-do, and to the south is the Gwangyang Bay.

Mountains in the city include Baegunsan (백운산, 1,217m), to the south is Gayasan (가야산, 497m) and Gubonghwasan (구봉화산, 473m). Baegunsan is the second-highest mountain in Jeollanam-do with the exception of Jirisan (지리산, 1,915 m).

The average yearly precipitation is 

As of October 14, 2007 plans are being set up and a referendum is being planned for a merging of the cities of Yeosu, Suncheon and Gwangyang into a new metropolitan city, taking advantage of the Gwangyang Bay Free Economic Zone, Yeosu's Expo 2012 bid and port facilities, Suncheon's educational institutes and Gwangyang's POSCO plant.

Climate

Symbols
 Tree : Gorosoe
 Bird : Sea gull
 Flower : Camellia

Gwangyang Steel Works
The Steel Works in Gwangyang is POSCO's second mill in the country after the mill in Pohang. The mill boasts having the largest steel plant in the world, the most modern technology, and the best facilities for steel manufacturing. It presently produces coil used for making bridges, iron structures, cars, refrigerators, and more. Its production capacity averages about 18 million tons per year. This plant is also a tourist destination for many people, attracting more than 300,000 people from around the globe.

Location
Gwangyang is a strategically important city situated in the southern center of the Korean peninsula. For these geopolitical reasons, Gwangyang is a city which functions as an axis for the balanced development of the country covering South Jeolla area with western parts of Mokpo and Muan.

Places of interest
Gwangyang is home to many unique natural and cultural sites as well as many different festivals during the four seasons.  
Points of interest include:
 The Baegun mountains
 Maehwa Village
 Yudang Park
 The Natural Resort Park.
The festivals include:
 The Baegun Mountain Medicinal Water Festival
 The Maehwa Culture Festival 
 The Jeoneo Fish Festival

Festival
Gwangyang is famous for its beautiful apricot trees. In Korean, Ume flower is called maehwa(매화) and it has been honored for its early blooming. Because of its characteristic, the Gwangyang Maehwa Festival is the earliest opened festival in the whole Jeollanam-do area.

Other festivals in Gwangyang are the Baegunsan Mountain Gorosoe Festival, Seomjingang Culture Festival and the Gwangyang Sutbulgui Festival.

International relations

Twin towns – Sister cities
Gwangyang is twinned with:

See also
 Hwanggeum-dong, Gwangyang
 List of cities in South Korea

References

External links

Gwangyang City government home page (in Korean)
Gwangyang City government home page (in English)

 
Cities in South Jeolla Province
Port cities and towns in South Korea